Bruno Labbadia (born 8 February 1966) is a German football manager and former player who played as a striker. He is the current manager of Bundesliga club VfB Stuttgart.

Personal life
Labbadia is of Italian ancestry. His family roots go back to Lenola, a town in the Lazio region. Labbadia's Italian parents moved to Germany as Gastarbeiter and settled in Schneppenhausen near Darmstadt in Hesse. Together with eight siblings, he and his family had lived on a farm for rent before moving to Weiterstadt when he was ten years old.

Labbadia communicated in Italian with his parents, while he spoke German with his siblings. He acquired his secondary school leaving certificate and trained as an insurance salesman. When he was 18 years old, he gave up Italian citizenship and became a German citizen, since in Germany only two foreigners were eligible to play in one team at the time, and so he gave place to a non-
German in the squad of SV Darmstadt 98. He was also associated with the German U21 national team.

Playing career
Labbadia made his debut for hometown 2. Bundesliga side Darmstadt 98 in 1984–85, scoring 9 goals in 33 games. Labbadia recorded 103 goals in 328 Bundesliga games across his career, including 50 goals for Arminia Bielefeld and 44 goals for his hometown club Darmstadt 98, as well as scoring 101 goals in 229 Bundesliga 2 games. He netted a total of 229 goals across all competitions in his career. having played for some of Germany's top Bundesliga clubs. He had two caps for the Germany national football team. His most successful season was probably the 1998–99 season, where he scored 29 goals for Arminia Bielefeld. Other notable seasons include 1986–87, where he scored 21 goals for Darmstadt 98, as well as 15 goal campaigns in 1987–88 and 1994–95 with top flight clubs Hamburger SV and 1. FC Köln. He also had 14 goals in his 1992–93 campaign with Bayern Munich and had 10 goals the next season where he was limited to only 23 appearances. His final season was in 2002–03 with 2. Bundesliga side Karlsruher SC where he netted 13 goals in 28 appearances.

Managerial career

Early career
Labbadia was hired as the manager of Darmstadt 98 on 8 May 2003. His first match was a 2–1 win against TSG Wörsdorf. In his first season, Darmstadt won promotion to the Regionalliga. Darmstadt started the 2004–05 season with a 2–1 loss to Mainz 05 II. Darmstadt finished the 2004–05 season in fifth place. Darmstadt started the 2005–06 season with a 2–1 win against VfR Aalen. Darmstadt finished the season in fifth place. Labbadia left on 30 June 2006. His final match was a 6–0 against SpVgg Bayreuth.

Labbadia was hired as Greuther Fürth's manager on 19 March 2007. Labbadia officially took over on 1 July 2007 when pre-season officially started. His first match was a 3–1 win against Darmstadt in the German Cup. Greuther Fürth finished the season in sixth place. He left the club on 26 May 2008 when he officially joined Bayer Leverkusen. Labbadia finished with a record of 15 wins, 10 draws, and 11 losses.

Bayer Leverkusen

Labbadia was hired by Bayer Leverkusen on 26 May 2008. His first match was a 3–2 win against Rot-Weiß Oberhausen in the German Cup. Bayer leverkusen finished the season in ninth place. After the season, Labaddia left Bayer Leverkusen and joined Hamburger SV. His final match was a 0–1 loss to Werder Bremen in the 2009 German Cup Final. Labbadia finished with a record of 19 wins, seven draws, and 14 losses.

Hamburger SV
Labaddia took over as Hamburg manager on 5 June 2009. His first match was a 4–0 win against Randers FC in the third qualifying round of the Europa League. Labbadia was dismissed on 26 April 2010, just three days before the Europa League semi-final second-leg tie against Fulham. His final match was a 5–1 loss to 1899 Hoffenheim. Hamburg were in seventh place in the 2009–10 Bundesliga table when they dismissed Labbadia. Labbadia finished with a record of 22 wins, 16 draws, and 13 losses.

VfB Stuttgart

On 12 December 2010 Labbadia became the new manager of VfB Stuttgart. His first match was a 5–1 win against Odense in the Europa League. In his first season with the club, he managed to save the club that was staring relegation in the face after the disastrous reigns of his two predecessors, Christian Gross and Jens Keller, ended in the last quarter of 2010. VfB Stuttgart finished in 12th place in the 2010–11 Bundesliga, and would then qualify for the 2012–13 UEFA Europa League by virtue of its sixth position in the 2011–12 Bundesliga.

Stuttgart started the 2012–13 season with a 5–0 win against SV Falkensee-Finkenkrug. On 30 January 2013, Labbadia signed a contract extension with Stuttgart, keeping him at the club until the summer of 2015. VfB Stuttgart lost the 2012–13 DFB-Pokal final to FC Bayern Munich, but qualified for the 2013–14 UEFA Europa League by virtue of the fact that Bayern Munich had also won the 2012–13 Bundesliga title.

In the morning of 26 August 2013, Labbadia was relieved of his duties with immediate effect. His club had lost the opening three Bundesliga matches and was in second last position in the Bundesliga table of the 2013–14 season. Prior to his sacking, Stuttgart had lost the first leg of the playoff round of the Europa League. During the press conference held in the afternoon on the same day, club president Bernd Wahler said, "Bruno Labbadia has done good work at VfB over the past three years but we want to provide fresh impetus with this change." Labbadia finished with a record of 50 wins, 24 draws, and 45 losses.

Return to Hamburg
Labaddia returned to Hamburger SV for a second spell on 15 April 2015. Labbadia won his first match on 25 April 2015 against FC Augsburg. This was Hamburg's first win since February 2015. Hamburg finished the 2014–15 season in the relegation playoff spot. In the first leg of the relegation playoff, on 28 May 2015, Hamburg and Karlsruher SC finished in a 1–1 draw. In the second leg, on 1 June 2015, Hamburg won 2–1 in extra time. Labbadia managed to keep Hamburg in the Bundesliga with a 10th-placed finish in the 2015–16 Bundesliga. However, Hamburg were knocked out of the German Cup in the first round during the 2015–16 season. Labbadia and his two assistants were sacked on 25 September 2016 after Hamburg had dropped into 16th position following their 0–1 Bundesliga defeat to Bayern Munich on the previous day, which was their fourth Bundesliga defeat in a row, having started the 2016–17 Bundesliga campaign with a draw at home to FC Ingolstadt.

VfL Wolfsburg
On 20 February 2018, Labbadia was hired by VfL Wolfsburg, replacing Martin Schmidt, who had stepped down the day before. His first match was a 1–1 draw against 1. FSV Mainz 05 on 23 February 2018. Wolfsburg finished the 2017–18 season in 16th place, which qualified Wolfsburg for the relegation playoff against Holstein Kiel. Labbadia currently has a record of four wins, three draws, and six losses in 13 matches. He left Wolfsburg in the summer of 2019.

Hertha BSC
Labbadia was appointed as the new manager of Hertha BSC on 9 April 2020. He coached the last nine matches in the 2019–20 season, finishing with a record of four wins, one draw, and four losses. Hertha BSC finished in 10th place. He was sacked on 24 January 2021.

Return to Stuttgart
Labbadia returned to Stuttgart in December 2022.

Career statistics

Club

Managerial record

Honours

Player
Bayern Munich
Bundesliga: 1993–94

References

External links

1966 births
Living people
Sportspeople from Darmstadt
Footballers from Hesse
German sportspeople of Italian descent
Association football forwards
German footballers
Germany international footballers
Germany under-21 international footballers
German football managers
SpVgg Greuther Fürth managers
Bayer 04 Leverkusen managers
Hamburger SV players
Hamburger SV managers
VfL Wolfsburg managers
VfB Stuttgart managers
Hertha BSC managers
1. FC Kaiserslautern players
FC Bayern Munich footballers
1. FC Köln players
SV Werder Bremen players
Arminia Bielefeld players
Karlsruher SC players
SV Darmstadt 98 players
Bundesliga players
2. Bundesliga players
Bundesliga managers
SV Darmstadt 98 managers
West German footballers